Vladimir Niculescu (born 26 September 1987, Bucharest) is a Romanian professional football player, who plays as a goalkeeper. He is a free agent.

Career
Niculescu started his career in 2006, at Sportul Studențesc. Four years later he promoted with his team and on 20 August 2010, Niculescu made his Liga I debut in a match against CFR Cluj.

At the beginning of 2012, Niculescu moved to the transylvanian team Gloria Bistrița. Later that year he was transferred to Damila Măciuca for whom he played only one match. In November 2012 Niculescu terminated the contract with Damila Măciuca by mutual agreement, the reason beyng his desire to play and not to be a reserve.

In April 2013 was brought at Universitatea Cluj by the manager of the team at that time, Ioan Viorel Ganea, and made the debut for his new team on 5 April 2013 in a victory against Astra Ploiești.

References

External links

 Profile on Universitatea Cluj official site
 

1987 births
Living people
Footballers from Bucharest
Romanian footballers
Association football goalkeepers
FC Sportul Studențesc București players
CS Sportul Snagov players
FC Universitatea Cluj players
Liga I players
Liga II players